In Memoriam is an album by American jazz group the Modern Jazz Quartet recorded in 1973 and released on the Little David label.

Background
On the Album In Memoriam, recorded a year before the start of their hiatus, the Modern Jazz Quartet was accompanied by an orchestra conducted by Maurice Peress. Pianist John Lewis wrote the title composition in tribute to Walter Keller, his piano teacher at the University of New Mexico. He composed "Jazz Ostinato" around 1960 during the third stream era ; it is based on three ostinato figures, the third of which he said was originally conceived as backing "for an Ornette Coleman – Eric Dolphy approach". Furthermore, the piece contains homages to Arnold Schoenberg and Igor Stravinsky, prompting Lewis to comment that it "also plays a part in  the memorium". The group had previously recorded the adagio from "Concierto de Aranjuez" with the guitarist Laurindo Almeida on their 1964 album Collaboration.

Reception
The Allmusic review stated "despite some stimulating moments, the music is often quite dry. It's one of the classic group's lesser releases".

Track listing
All compositions by John Lewis except as indicated
 "In Memoriam – First Movement" – 8:40   
 "In Memoriam – Second Movement"  9:03   
 "Jazz Ostinato" – 6:19   
 "Adagio from the Guitar Concerto: Concerto de Aranjuez" (Joaquín Rodrigo) – 9:49

Personnel
Milt Jackson – vibraphone
John Lewis – piano
Percy Heath – bass
Connie Kay – drums
Unnamed orchestra conducted by Maurice Peress
Stanley Tonkel – recording engineer
Gene Paul, John Lewis – re-mix engineers
Edd Kolakowski – Steinway piano technician

References

Modern Jazz Quartet albums
1974 albums
Albums produced by Teo Macero
Albums with cover art by Drew Struzan
Little David Records albums